12th Online Film Critics Society Awards
January 19, 2009

Best Picture:
 WALL-E 
The 12th Online Film Critics Society Awards, honoring the best in film for 2008, were given on 19 January 2009.

Winners and nominees

Best Picture
WALL-E
The Curious Case of Benjamin Button
The Dark Knight
Slumdog Millionaire
The Wrestler

Best Director
Christopher Nolan – The Dark Knight
Darren Aronofsky – The Wrestler
Danny Boyle – Slumdog Millionaire
David Fincher – The Curious Case of Benjamin Button
Andrew Stanton – WALL-E

Best Actor
Mickey Rourke – The Wrestler
Benicio del Toro – Che
Richard Jenkins – The Visitor
Frank Langella – Frost/Nixon
Sean Penn – Milk

Best Actress
Michelle Williams – Wendy and Lucy
Anne Hathaway – Rachel Getting Married
Sally Hawkins – Happy-Go-Lucky
Meryl Streep – Doubt
Kate Winslet – Revolutionary Road

Best Supporting Actor
Heath Ledger – The Dark Knight
Robert Downey Jr. – Tropic Thunder
Philip Seymour Hoffman – Doubt
Eddie Marsan – Happy-Go-Lucky
Michael Shannon – Revolutionary Road

Best Supporting Actress
Marisa Tomei – The Wrestler
Amy Adams – Doubt
Penélope Cruz – Vicky Cristina Barcelona
Viola Davis – Doubt
Kate Winslet – The Reader

Best Original Screenplay
WALL-E – Andrew Stanton & Jim ReardonIn Bruges – Martin McDonagh
Milk – Dustin Lance Black
Synecdoche, New York – Charlie Kaufman
The Wrestler – Robert D. Siegel

Best Adapted ScreenplayLet the Right One In – John Ajvide LindqvistThe Curious Case of Benjamin Button – Eric Roth
The Dark Knight – Jonathan Nolan & Christopher Nolan
Frost/Nixon – Peter Morgan
Slumdog Millionaire – Simon Beaufoy

Best Foreign Language FilmLet the Right One In
A Christmas Tale
The Counterfeiters
I've Loved You So Long
Waltz with Bashir

Best Documentary
Man on Wire
Dear Zachary: A Letter to a Son About His Father
Encounters at the End of the World
I.O.U.S.A.
My Winnipeg

Best Animated Feature
WALL-E
Bolt
Dr. Seuss' Horton Hears a Who
Kung Fu Panda
Waltz with Bashir

Best Cinematography
The Dark Knight – Wally PfisterAustralia – Mandy Walker
Che – Peter Andrews
The Fall – Colin Watkinson
Slumdog Millionaire – Anthony Dod Mantle

Best EditingSlumdog Millionaire – Chris DickensThe Curious Case of Benjamin Button – Kirk Baxter & Angus Wall
The Dark Knight – Lee Smith
Milk – Elliot Graham
WALL-E – Stephen Schaffer

Best Original ScoreThe Dark Knight – James Newton Howard & Hans ZimmerThe Curious Case of Benjamin Button – Alexandre Desplat
Milk – Danny Elfman
Slumdog Millionaire – A. R. Rahman
WALL-E – Thomas Newman

Breakthrough FilmmakerTomas Alfredson – Let the Right One In
Charlie Kaufman – Synecdoche, New York
Kurt Kuenne – Dear Zachary: A Letter to a Son About His Father
Martin McDonagh – In Bruges
Steve McQueen – Hunger

Breakthrough Performer
Lina Leandersson – Let the Right One In
Russell Brand – Forgetting Sarah Marshall
Kåre Hedebrant – Let the Right One In
Dev Patel – Slumdog Millionaire
Brandon Walters – Australia

References 

2008 film awards
2008